Saint Ambrose Catholic School or Saint Ambrose School may refer to:
 Saint Ambrose Catholic School - Tucson, Arizona
 Saint Ambrose Catholic School - Deerfield Beach, Florida  - List of schools of the Roman Catholic Archdiocese of Miami
 Saint Ambrose School - Godfrey, Illinois
 Saint Ambrose Catholic School - Cheverly, Maryland - List of schools of the Roman Catholic Archdiocese of Washington
 Saint Ambrose of Woodbury Catholic School - Woodbury, Minnesota
 Saint Ambrose Catholic Elementary School - Saint Louis, Missouri
 Saint Ambrose School - Old Bridge, New Jersey - List of schools of the Roman Catholic Diocese of Metuchen
 Saint Ambrose School - Latham, New York
 Saint Ambrose Catholic School - Brunswick, Ohio
 Saint Ambrose School - Schuylkill Haven, Pennsylvania
 Saint Ambrose Catholic School - Houston, Texas - List of schools of the Roman Catholic Archdiocese of Galveston-Houston
 Saint Ambrose Catholic School - Annandale, Virginia